Bridge L6113 is a historic bridge in Congdon Park in Duluth, Minnesota, United States.  Built in 1925, it carries East 4th Street over Tischer Creek.  Structurally it is a reinforced concrete arch bridge with a veneer of local gabbro masonry.  Artistically it mixes rustic, uncoursed masonry with neoclassical details in its limestone belt courses and arch ring.  Bridge L6113 was listed on the National Register of Historic Places in 2016 for its local significance in the theme of engineering.  It was nominated for its high aesthetic value of mixed architectural styles complementing its park setting.

See also
 List of bridges on the National Register of Historic Places in Minnesota
 National Register of Historic Places listings in St. Louis County, Minnesota

References

External links
 Bridge L6113–Minnesota Department of Transportation

1925 establishments in Minnesota
Bridges completed in 1925
Buildings and structures in Duluth, Minnesota
Concrete bridges in Minnesota
Deck arch bridges in the United States
National Register of Historic Places in St. Louis County, Minnesota
Neoclassical architecture in Minnesota
Road bridges on the National Register of Historic Places in Minnesota
Rustic architecture in Minnesota
Transportation in Duluth, Minnesota